The Culp Special is an American aerobatic homebuilt aircraft designed and produced by Culp's Specialties of Shreveport, Louisiana. The aircraft is supplied as a kit or in the form of plans for amateur construction.

Design and development
The Culp Special is intended to resemble an aircraft of the 1930s. It features a wire and strut-braced biplane layout, a two-seats-in-tandem open cockpit with dual windshields, fixed conventional landing gear with wheel pants, and a single engine in tractor configuration.

The aircraft is made from welded steel tubing and wood, all covered in doped aircraft fabric. The standard engine used is the Russian  Vedeneyev M14P nine cylinder, air-cooled, four stroke radial engine.

The manufacturer estimates the construction time from the supplied kit as 2500 hours.

Operational history
By 1998 the company reported that one aircraft was flying.

In December 2016, three examples were registered in the United States with the Federal Aviation Administration and one in Canada with Transport Canada.

Specifications (Culp Special)

See also
List of aerobatic aircraft

References

External links

Official gallery of Culp Special photos

Special
1990s United States sport aircraft
Single-engined tractor aircraft
Homebuilt aircraft
Biplanes
Aerobatic aircraft